The Reverend Wilfrid Alec Radford Young (5 October 1867 – 19 March 1947) played first-class cricket for Somerset in the period from 1889 to 1893 immediately before and after the side's elevation to first-class status. He was born at Brighton, Sussex, and died at the rectory at Kimcote, Leicestershire.

Young was educated at Harrow School and as a right-handed middle-order batsman and a right-arm slow bowler he played in the socially important Eton v Harrow cricket match at Lord's in three seasons from 1883 to 1885. He went to Selwyn College, Cambridge University, and played in a trial match for the Cambridge cricket team, but did not make any first-team appearances. He appeared for Somerset in several matches in the 1889 and 1890 seasons: Somerset was at this point a second-class county, and the success of the side in 1890 was a material factor in its elevation to first-class cricket status for the 1891 season, when it was allowed to compete in the County Championship. Young only appeared twice in first-class matches for Somerset, once in each of the 1891 and 1893 seasons, and he did not bowl in either of them. His only runs came in the 1891 match: he scored 13 against Surrey. In his 1893 game against Lancashire he failed to score in either innings. 

He became a parson in the Church of England and his final post was as rector of Kimcote, where he died in 1947.

References

1867 births
1947 deaths
Sportspeople from Brighton
English cricketers
Somerset cricketers
People educated at Harrow School